Anna Puu (born Anna Puustjärvi; February 3, 1982) is a Finnish singer-songwriter. She placed second in Finland's Idols 2008 competition.

Puu's first album, Anna Puu, was released on April 29, 2009, and reached #1. The first single, "C'est la vie", was released in mid-April and reached #1 in Finland. Another single, "Kaunis päivä", reached #6 on the Finnish charts, but the last single "Melankolian riemut" failed to make an impact on the charts. The album has since sold over 60,000 copies.

Puu released a second album, Sahara, on May 26, 2010, and it also reached #1. The singles "Riko minut" and "Sinä olet minä" failed to chart. Her third album, Antaudun, was released on October 26, 2012, and reached #2. "Kolme pientä sanaa", the first single, failed to chart.

Discography

Albums

Singles

References

External links

Last.fm page
Popgram.fi page
http://artists.letssingit.com/anna-puu-wrj9x/overview

1982 births
Living people
Finnish pop singers
21st-century Finnish singers